Giovanni Bozzi (born May 22, 1963) is a former Belgian professional basketball coach. He is the current chairman of basketball team Spirou Charleroi.

Career
Bozzi started his career with two seasons for RBC Verviers-Pepinster. In 1991 he left for Spirou Charleroi, where he coached for 11 consecutive seasons. In those seasons he won 5 Belgian championships with Spirou. From 2003 till 2007 he was the head coach of Liège Basket. With Liège he won the Belgian league and Supercup in 2004.

In 2009 he returned to his former club, Spirou Charleroi. Bozzi added another 2 Belgian championships to his list of honours. In 2014, he ended his coaching career and become the chairman of Spirou.

Honours
Belgian Championship (6): 1996, 1997, 1998, 1999, 2004, 2010, 2011
Belgian Cup (3): 1996, 1999, 2009
Belgian Supercup (1): 2004
BLB Coach of the Year (3): 1991, 1998, 1999

References

External links
Profile at Spirou Charleroi website

1963 births
Living people
Belgian basketball coaches
RBC Verviers-Pepinster coaches